Ministry of Ethnic Affairs is a Myanmar government ministry formed by the President's Office Declaration No. 1/2016 on March 30, 2016 under President U Htin Kyaw. On May 25, 2016, the Ministry of Ethnic Affairs was renamed the Ministry of Ethnic Affairs to comply with the law protecting the rights of ethnic nationalities. The Union Minister for Ethnic Affairs is Saw Tun Aung Myint.

Structure 
Departments under the Ministry of Ethnic Affairs are:-
Department of Ethnic Literature and Culture and
the Department for the Protection of Ethnic Rights.

Union Ministers
Naing Thet Lwin (30 March 2016 - 1 February 2021)
Saw Tun Aung Myint (3 February 2021 - Incumbent)

Region or State Ethnic Affairs Ministers
The Region or State Ethnic Affairs Ministers are as follows:

References 

EthnicAffairs